This is a list of schools in Wrexham County Borough in Wales.

Primary schools

Acrefair Community Primary School
Acton Park Community Primary School
Alexandra Community Primary School	
All Saints VA Primary School	
Bangor on Dee Community Primary School	
Barker's Lane Community Primary School	
Black Lane Community Primary School
Borderbrook School	
Borras Park Infant School	
Borras Park Junior School
Bronington VA Primary School	
Brynteg Community Primary School	
Bwlchgwyn Community Primary School	
Cefn Mawr Community Primary School			
Eyton VC Primary School	
Froncysyllte Community Primary School	
Garth Community Primary School	
Gwenfro Community Primary School
Gwersyllt Community Primary School
Hafod y Wern Community Primary School	
Holt Community Primary School			
Johnstown Infant School	
Johnstown Junior School	
Llanarmon Dyffryn Ceiriog School
Madras VA Primary School
Minera VA School	
Park Community Primary School		
Pentre VC Primary School
Penygelli Community Primary School
Penycae Community Primary School
Pontfadog Community Primary School
Rhosddu Primary School		
Rhostyllen Community Primary School
Rhosymedre Community Primary School
The Rofft Community Primary School
St Anne's RC Primary School	
St Chad's CW VA Primary School	
St Giles VC CW Primary	School
St Mary's Aided School, Brymbo		
St Mary's CW Primary School, Ruabon
St Mary's RC Primary School, Wrexham	
St Mary's VA School, Overton on Dee	
St Paul's VA Primary School
St Peter's VC Primary School
Southsea Community Primary School
Victoria Primary School
Wat's Dyke Community Primary School
Ysgol Deiniol 	
Ysgol Heulfan	
Ysgol Maes y Llan 
Ysgol Maes y Mynydd
Ysgol Penrhyn
Ysgol y Waun

Welsh medium Primary Schools
Ysgol Bodhyfryd
Ysgol Bryn Tabor
Ysgol Cynddelw (Dual language)
Ysgol I.D. Hooson 	
Ysgol Min y Ddol 		
Ysgol Plas Coch 	
Ysgol Bro Alun

Secondary schools
The Maelor School
Darland High School
Rhosnesni High School
St Joseph's Catholic & Anglican High School
Ysgol Bryn Alyn
Ysgol Clywedog
Ysgol Rhiwabon
Ysgol y Grango

Welsh medium Secondary schools

Ysgol Morgan Llwyd

Special schools
St Christopher's School

 
Wrexham